The Lincoln Performing Arts Centre (LPAC) is a 446-seat multi-purpose auditorium, designed for live arts performances, conferences, and film screenings, in Lincoln, Lincolnshire, England, and part of the University of Lincoln.

History
It opened on 20 January 2008, with a recital by the cellist Steven Isserlis. The theatre's programme of events is designed to complement, rather than compete with, those of its neighbouring venues, such as the Theatre Royal, Lincoln.

The Just a Minute radio programme was recorded at the venue on 26 January 2009.

Funding
The building has been funded by the University of Lincoln, Lincolnshire County Council (including This is Art), the City of Lincoln Council, Lincolnshire Enterprise (£1.8 million), the East Midlands Development Agency, and Arts Council England.

Construction

Design
The consulting engineers were Ward Cole, who are situated off Carholme Road (A57). They also worked on the University's School of Architecture and library, the Engine Shed, the student accommodation next to the Foss Dyke, Lincoln Nuffield Hospital, Witham Wharf (on the Brayford), and the city's Odeon cinema.

The architects were Stem Architects, based in Sparkhouse Studios on the campus, who have designed the majority of the University's buildings, including the new Enterprise @ Lincoln building.

Equipment
The building consists of the theatre and the new Centre for Innovation in Performing Arts, a base for undergraduate and postgraduate students, with LSPA.

The centre piece of the new building is a 446-seat theatre which will host professional touring theatre, music and dance productions plus film screenings by students from the Lincoln School of Performing Arts.

Facilities
It has the Zing Café open from 9am to 5pm during term time, and for night-time events there is the Theatre Bar. There is a Box Office in the Tower Bar Foyer in the Engine Shed open from 10am to 4pm.

Ancillary functions
LPAC also offers educational and outreach arts work with local communities. The £5.9 million centre is also home to the Lincoln School of Performing Arts (LSPA) where around 240 students study for both undergraduate and postgraduate degrees in drama and dance. Arranged around the theatre are studios for dance, drama and music, as well as office spaces and control and dimming rooms designed specifically to enable instruction of students during live performance.

References

External links
 LPAC
 LSPA
 Lincoln Symphony Orchestra
 East Midlands Cinema Advice

Music venues completed in 2008
Theatres completed in 2008
University of Lincoln
Theatres in Lincolnshire
Buildings and structures in Lincoln, England
Performing arts centres in the United Kingdom